Jamyang Norbu (Tibetan: འཇམ་དབྱངས་ནོར་བུ་, Wylie: 'jam-dbyangs nor-bu) is a Tibetan political activist and writer, currently living in the United States, having previously lived for over 40 years as a Tibetan exile in India.

Biography 

Norbu attended St. Joseph's School in Darjeeling, India. As a teenager, he dropped out of school and ran away from home to join the Tibetan guerrilla group Chushi Gangdruk, which operated from Mustang in Nepal. He was the creator of Tibetans-in-exile taxation system, or the Green Book, which has helped fund the exile government since 1972. Later he founded and directed the Amnye Machen Institute, Tibetan Centre for Advanced Studies, in Dharamsala.

Politics 
Jamyang Norbu has been called a "radical Tibetan separatist" by the People's Daily. His advocacy for complete Tibetan independence and criticism of the nonviolent "Middle Way" autonomy plan of the Central Tibetan Administration has led him to push for more "confrontational" methods.

Jamyang Norbu is also critical of the role of religion in the Tibetan exile community, and of its Western benefactors who, he argues, see Tibetans one-dimensionally. He calls the "New Age perception of Tibet... that this even materialist west will be saved by the spiritualism of the Tibetan Buddhists" "total nonsense." He said of a scene from the American film Seven Years in Tibet where Tibetan monks rescue earthworms from a construction site, that Tibetan viewers would find it ridiculous. In a 2005 article for the New Humanist, he recalled an outbreak of rabies in 1983 Dharamsala: when he advocated that a Tibetan woman get a rabies shot instead of seeing a shaman, he was shunned in the community as a "nonbeliever." He lamented, "We are frankly, a people still in thrall to ignorance and superstition, which far from declining with the years seems to be gaining new life and impetus with foreign sponsorship and encouragement."

Writings 
Norbu has written several books and theater pieces in English and in Tibetan. Illusion and Reality, a collection of his political essays, was published in 1989. In 2000 he received the Hutch Crossword Book Award for The Mandala of Sherlock Holmes. The book was published in the U.S. in 2001, first under the title Sherlock Holmes - The Missing Years, and fills in the gap in 1891 when Arthur Conan Doyle temporarily killed off Holmes. In the book, Holmes joins Huree Chunder Mookerjee, another fictional spy who last worked for the English in Rudyard Kipling's Kim.

He has written many book reviews, including that of Professor Grunfeld.

In 2011, he participated in the International Writing Program (IWP) Fall Residency at the University of Iowa in Iowa City, IA.

Books In English by Jamyang Norbu 
 Buying the Dragon's Teeth, High Asia Press, 2004, 
Warriors of Tibet: The Story of Aten and the Khampas' Fight for the Freedom of Their Country (originally titled Horseman in the Snow), Wisdom, 1987, Wisdom Pub., .
The Mandala of Sherlock Holmes, Bloomsbury USA, 2003, .
Illusion and reality, Tibetan Youth Congress, 1989.

References 

1949 births
Living people
Tibetan activists
Tibet freedom activists
Tibetan diaspora
Tibetan writers
International Writing Program alumni
Tibetan emigrants to India
Tibetan refugees